A triangulation station, also known as a trigonometrical point, and sometimes informally as a trig, is a fixed surveying station, used in geodetic surveying and other surveying projects in its vicinity. The nomenclature varies regionally: they are generally known as trigonometrical stations or triangulation stations in North America, trig points in the United Kingdom, trig pillars in Ireland, trig stations or trig points in Australia and New Zealand, and trig beacons in South Africa.

Use
The station is usually set up by a government with known coordinates and elevation published.  Many stations are located on hilltops for the purposes of visibility.  A graven metal plate on the top of a pillar may provide a mounting point for a theodolite or reflector, often using some form of kinematic coupling to ensure reproducible positioning.

Trigonometrical stations are grouped together to form a network of triangulation. Positions of all land boundaries, roads, railways, bridges and other infrastructure can be accurately located by the network, a task that is essential to the construction of modern infrastructure. Apart from the known stations set up by government, some temporary trigonometrical stations are set up near construction sites for monitoring the precision and progress of construction.

Some trigonometrical stations use the Global Positioning System for convenience. Its accuracy depends on factors such as ionospheric and tropospheric propagation delay errors.

Although stations are no longer required for many surveying purposes, they remain useful to hikers as navigational aids. Trig points or Triangulation Pillars are another way of spotting the top of a mountain on a map. The symbol for a trig point is a small triangle. They are real concrete pillars that are placed at particular places which are usually the tops of hills or mountains.

Australia

A national geodetic survey and adjustment carried out in the early 1970s in Australia has left a legacy of trig stations, many consisting of a ground mark with a black quadripod (pyramid frame) supporting a visible disc above the ground mark.

France
Managed by I.G.N. All 380000 French géodesics terminals are available on https://geodesie.ign.fr/index.php?page=reperes_de_nivellement and on an interactiv & collaborative map tool for smartphone available on google store "géodésie de poche". Each terminal are fully detailled lat/long /altitude RGF93 ellipsoïd location and photo. They can be remarquable points as churches steeple crosses, ground rocks square blocks, or, in town, 12cm cylinders sticked against base walls. Both tools also display GNSS EGNOS permanent base stations.

Hong Kong

Many trigonometrical stations were placed on hilltops around Hong Kong. They strongly resemble those used in other British colonial territories such as Australia, consisting of a white column topped with a black band.

Japan

In Japan, there are five classes of :

They are installed approximately every , with smaller ones (as necessary) about every . There are about 1000 throughout Japan.

They are installed approximately every . Each pillar is anchored with a very large perpendicular rock buried underground.

There are about 32,000 installed throughout Japan, with one approximately every .

They are installed approximately every , and there are about 69,000 throughout Japan.

These markers were installed in 1899 and are the predecessors to the modern triangulation stations used in Japan today. They are generally not used anymore since the installation of the Class 1-4 stations. Some of them still exist at various locations throughout Japan.

South Africa

South Africa has a network of approximately 28,000 trig beacons, established by the Chief Directorate: National Geo-spatial Information (historically known as the Trigonometrical Survey). These beacons are typically white-painted concrete pillars supporting black metal plates in a cross shape, installed on mountains, hills or tall buildings.

Spain

In Spain there are 11,000 triangulation stations, concrete buildings which typically consist of a cylinder 120 cm high and 30 cm diameter over a concrete cubic base.

They were erected by the Instituto Geográfico Nacional, usually painted in white, and can be marked with a metallic label with the warning: "The destruction of this sign is punishable by law."

United Kingdom

In the United Kingdom, trig points are typically concrete pillars and were erected by the Ordnance Survey.

The process of placing trig points on top of prominent hills and mountains began in 1935 to assist in the accurate retriangulation of Great Britain. The Ordnance Survey's first trig point was erected on 18 April 1936 near Cold Ashby, Northamptonshire. In low-lying or flat areas some trig points are only a few metres above sea level and one is even at −1 m (near Little Ouse, Cambridgeshire, TL61718 89787).  When all the trig points were in place, it was possible in clear weather to see at least two other trig points from any one trig point, but subsequent vegetation growth means that this is not necessarily still the case. Careful measurements of the angles between the lines-of-sight of the other trig points then allowed the construction of a system of triangles which could then be referenced back to a single baseline to construct a highly accurate measurement system that covered the entire country.

In most of the UK, trig points are truncated square concrete (occasionally stone) pyramids or obelisks tapering towards the top. On the top a brass plate with three arms and a central depression is fixed: it is used to mount and centre a theodolite used to take angular measurements to neighbouring trig points. A benchmark is usually set on the side, marked with the letters "O S B M" (Ordnance Survey Bench Mark) and the reference number of the trig point. Within and below the visible trig point, there are concealed reference marks whose National Grid References are precisely known. The standard trig point design is credited to Brigadier Martin Hotine (1898–1968), head of the Trigonometrical and Levelling Division of the Ordnance Survey. Many of them are now disappearing from the countryside as their function has largely been superseded by aerial photography and digital mapping using lasers and GPS. To quote from a page at the OS site: "Like an iceberg, there is more of trig pillar below the surface than above it." From the same source: "Today the receivers that make up the OS Net network are coordinated to an accuracy of just 3 mm over the entire length of Great Britain."

See also
 Struve Geodetic Arc
 Bilby tower
 Boundary marker
 Geodesy
 Ordnance Survey
 Retriangulation of Great Britain
 Survey marker
 Trigpointing is a pastime in which people individually go out, find and log the location of trig points.
 Cover of Martyn Bennett's album Grit

References

External links

 TrigpointingUK
 GPS Waypoints of all UK Trigpoints
 Photos of examples of trig points in the UK on geograph.org.uk
 Database of trig points in the United Kingdom
 Repères de nivellement. French I.G.N 
 Serveur de fiches (maps).  French I.G.N 
 Database of trig points in New Zealand
 "Trig pillars we salute you", blog post from UK Ordnance Survey

Surveying and geodesy markers